Richard Van Genechten (23 July 1930 – 13 November 2010) was a Belgian professional racing cyclist. He rode in four editions of the Tour de France.

References

External links
 

1930 births
2010 deaths
Belgian male cyclists
Cyclists from Brussels